The Free Iraqi Forces (FIF) were a militia made up of Iraqi expatriates, who served in the 2003 invasion of Iraq and its aftermath, under the control of Ahmed Chalabi's Iraqi National Congress government-in-exile. The specifically paramilitary branch of the program was also known as the Free Iraqi Fighting Forces (FIFF), while other elements served as interpreters or on civil affairs projects.

Composition
The original intent of the American Office of the Secretary of Defense was to recruit and train 3,000 Iraqi expatriates in Taszar, Hungary in preparation for the war. Recruitment, however, fell well below the target number, and were of dubious military utility, ranging from ages 18 to 55.

Operations
The program was seen as unsuccessful, with at one point some US$63 million spent to recruit and train 69 troops for the FIF, and the program was dissolved in April 2003. The FIFF never numbered more than 500 troops. The units were also seen as undisciplined and pro-Shia and anti-Sunni, and engaged in looting.

References

2003 establishments in Iraq
Paramilitary forces of Iraq
Military wings of political parties